The Backcountry Super Cubs Supercruiser is an American amateur-built aircraft, designed and produced by Backcountry Super Cubs of Douglas, Wyoming. The aircraft is based upon the design of the Piper PA-12 Super Cruiser and is supplied as a kit for amateur construction.

Design and development
The aircraft seats the pilot in front and two passengers in the rear on a bench seat.

The aircraft fuselage is made from welded steel tubing, with the wings constructed of aluminum sheet, all covered in doped aircraft fabric. Construction time from the supplied kit is 1200 hours.

Operational history
By December 2011, 140 examples had been reported as completed and flown.

Specifications (Supercruiser)

References

External links

Homebuilt aircraft
Single-engined tractor aircraft
Backcountry Super Cubs aircraft